Chukokkala (Чукоккала) is a unique literary work produced by Russian writer Korney Chukovsky of genre difficult to identify. Traditionally described in Russian literary theory  as "handwritten almanac", it is an eclectic mixture of autograph book/diary/scrapbook/guestbook/memoir, maintained since 1914 to late 1960s and first published in 1979 supplied with Chukovsky's comments. Over the time Chukokkala collected a large number of autographs, literary and drawing sketches, notes, puzzles, etc., of numerous famous people. 

As Chukovsky explained himself,  the name is the portmanteau of his name and "Kuokkala," the name of the place where he lived when he started the autograph book. 

The preparation of the first, 1979 print edition, was started by Chukovsky himself; he supplied it with a detailed commentary and archival materials. However it was heavily censored. The second, 1999 edition was still incomplete. The first complete edition was published in 2006.

Asteroid number 3094 has a name 3094 Chukokkala

References
  

Russian memoirs
Works by Korney Chukovsky